The Essential Alan Parsons Project is a compilation album released by English progressive rock musician Alan Parsons and The Alan Parsons Project on 6 February 2007. It was released through Sony BMG as part of The Essential album series. The album featured some of the band's best known songs as well as some rare tracks.

The Essential Alan Parsons Project is a double-disc album which contains all the band's hits and some of their lesser-known songs, spanning their 10-year career. Disc 1 contains the hits and well-known songs, while Disc 2 contains the rarer and more obscure selections. The album includes songs from all their studio albums, from Tales of Mystery and Imagination to Gaudi, with the exception of the band's final album, Freudiana.

The album includes some of the band's biggest hits such as "Eye in the Sky", "Time", "I Wouldn't Want to Be Like You" and "Games People Play", as well as some lesser-known songs such as "Paseo de Gracia".

The Essential Alan Parsons Project is a great compilation album for fans of the band. It showcases their best known songs as well as some of their lesser-known gems. The album is an essential part of any Alan Parsons Project fan's collection.

Track listing
All songs written by Alan Parsons and Eric Woolfson, except where noted.

2-Disc Version

Disc 2

3-Disc Version

Release history

Charts

Personnel 
Alan Parsons – production, engineering, composer
Eric Woolfson – vocals, keyboards, composer, lyrics
Ian Bairnson – guitars
David Paton – bass
Stuart Tosh – drums
Lenny Zakatek – vocals
Stuart Elliott – drums
Chris Rainbow – vocals
Mel Collins – saxophone

Notes

References

The Alan Parsons Project albums
2007 greatest hits albums
Albums produced by Alan Parsons
Arista Records compilation albums
Sony Music compilation albums
Sony BMG compilation albums
Legacy Recordings compilation albums